James Edington Montgomery O'Hair House, also known as the J.E.M. O'Hair House, is a historic home located in Monroe Township, Putnam County, Indiana. The original section was built about 1835, with an ell added in 1863. It is a two-story, Federal style brick I-house. It rests on a limestone foundation and has a side-gable roof.  The interior was remodeled about 1880, and incorporates Eastlake movement design elements.

It was listed on the National Register of Historic Places in 1992.

References

Houses on the National Register of Historic Places in Indiana
Federal architecture in Indiana
Houses completed in 1835
Buildings and structures in Putnam County, Indiana
National Register of Historic Places in Putnam County, Indiana